Rachana Maurya is an Indian actress, model and dancer who has appeared in music videos and performed item numbers in various Indian films. She is probably best known for her performances in Dus, Souryam and Yavarum Nalam.

Filmography

Music videos
 Thodi Mila De Tu (Soda Whiskey) - Rishi Singh (Album: Desi)
 My Name is Ajitabh - Ajitabh Ranjan
 Maya the Illusion - Rahul Sharma
 Pallo Latke - Sanyh Rawani (Album: Max It Sanyh)
 Nishani - Jassi Sohal
 Tere Naal Nachna - Sukhbir
 Meri Jaan Neh - Mehsopuria (Album: Warrior)
 Main Hogaya Sharabbi - Panjabi MC (Album: Steel Battle)
 Phullan Wangu - Jassi Sohal (Album: Nishani)
 Birkan - Raminder Bhuller (Album: Vanjli Wala)
 Dil Nashe Mein Choor Hai - Kumar Sanu (Album: Dil Nashe Mein Choor Hai)

References

External links
 

Actresses from Mumbai
Indian film actresses
Actresses in Tamil cinema
Living people
Actresses in Malayalam cinema
Year of birth missing (living people)
Actresses in Hindi cinema
Actresses in Telugu cinema
Actresses in Kannada cinema
21st-century Indian actresses